The 1922–23 Drexel Blue and Gold men's basketball team represented Drexel Institute of Art, Science and Industry during the 1922–23 men's basketball season. The Blue and Gold, led by 1st year head coach Harvey O'Brien, played their home games at Main Building.

Roster

Schedule

|-
!colspan=9 style="background:#F8B800; color:#002663;"| Regular season
|-

References

Drexel Dragons men's basketball seasons
Drexel
1922 in sports in Pennsylvania
1923 in sports in Pennsylvania